Lindsay Lee-Waters and Megan Moulton-Levy were the defending champions, but both players chose not to participate. 
Alexa Glatch and Mashona Washington won the title by defeating Varvara Lepchenko and Melanie Oudin in the final 6–4, 6–2.

Seeds

Draw

Draw

References
 Main Draw

Lexus of Las Vegas Open - Doubles
Party Rock Open
2011 Party Rock Open